Lunenburg County is a historical county and census division on the South Shore of the Canadian province of Nova Scotia. Major settlements include Bridgewater, Lunenburg, and Mahone Bay.

History
Named in honour of the British king who was also the duke of Brunswick-Lüneburg, it was established in 1759, when the Nova Scotia peninsula was divided into five counties. The county became smaller when new counties were created from its boundaries: Queens (1762), Hants (1781), Shelburne (1784), and Sydney (1784).

By Chapter 52 of the Statutes of 1863, Lunenburg County was divided into two districts for court sessional purposes – Chester and Lunenburg. That statute provided authority for the appointment of a Custos Rotulorum and for the establishment of a general sessions of the peace for the District of Chester, with the same powers as if it were a separate county. In 1879, the two districts were incorporated as district municipalities.

Governance
Today the county has no legal status, although its borders are coincident with the five municipalities contained within it:
 the municipality of the District of Chester
 the municipality of the District of Lunenburg
 the town of Bridgewater
 the town of Lunenburg
 the town of Mahone Bay
The above municipalities comprise the entire territory of the county.

There are three Sipekneꞌkatik First Nation reserves in the county:
Gold River 21
New Ross 20
Pennal 19

Demographics 

Population trend

Mother tongue language (2011)

Ethnic Groups (2006)

Religious make-up (2001)

Access routes
Highways and numbered routes that run through the county, including external routes that start or finish at the county boundary:

Highways

Trunk Routes

Collector Routes:

External Routes:
None

See also
List of communities in Lunenburg County, Nova Scotia
List of communities in Nova Scotia
Lunenburg English, the distinctive dialect of the area

References

External links
Photographs of historic monuments in Lunenburg County
Lunenburg County Map